Phoebe Ruguru (born 1997) is a Kenyan film producer known for producing the film 18 Hours which won the Best Overall Movie in Africa, at the 2018 AMVCA. This category had never seen a Kenyan film be nominated, and so marked history as the first Kenyan film to be nominated and win in the history of the awards.

Early life 
Phoebe Ruguru was born in Kenya and lived with her parents in Nakuru before moving to Limuru with her mother when her parents divorced. Phoebe attended nursery school at a small school called Sunflower and then went to Gramabe Academy in Kabuku, Limuru. She moved to St. Peter's Girls Boarding School in Elburgon, Molo, in her fourth year then to Brook Hill Academy before moving to England age 11.

In her A-Levels, Phoebe studied at the King’s School (The Cathedral), Peterborough, UK and joined SOAS, University of London to study BA International Relations and Anthropology (Combined degree). She was drawn to the degree course in an effort to develop an understanding of different cultures and concepts she is drawn to, such as equality through female empowerment, education, film and development. Phoebe graduated in July 2018.

Film Making Career 
As a young achiever her breakout came through when she became the first Kenyan to win an international award in 2014 at the Unchosen Modern Day Slavery Competition which was held in London. Her film ‘Saidia’ won in the category of ‘The Best Young Filmmaker’. The short film Saidia revolved around a case study of human trafficking. What’s even more interesting is that the award winning low budget film was shot purely by an iphone 4s.

International Relations Achievements 
In October 2015, at just 18 years old, Phoebe was honored as a guest speaker at the House of Lords to deliver a speech on Female Leadership during International Girl Child Day celebrations.

 Winner of `Young Achiever’s Award’ at Women4Africa Award London, 2016.
 Winner of `Young Achiever’s Award’ at African Women in Europe Conference in Geneva, 2015.
 “The Nostalgic Mind of a Young Diaspora Woman’ a book chapter authored by Phoebe is among other chapters in a published book echoing the diaspora experience for African Women in Europe

References 

1997 births
Living people
Kenyan film directors
Kenyan women film directors
Kenyan film producers